Final Boss is the third studio album from nerdcore hip hop artist MC Frontalot. It was released on November 4, 2008.  The first single, "Wallflowers", is available to listen to at his website, as well as the title track Final Boss, and Diseases of Yore.

"Final Boss" is composed mostly of new material but does include two remakes from before Nerdcore Rising ("Listen Close" and "A Very Unlikely Occurrence").

The front cover art for the album was done by Scott Campbell. Back cover by Dennis Hansbury. Design by Suchascream.net.

Track listing

Personnel
Damian Hess - Rapping, Lyrics, Drum Programming
Jesse McDonald - Lyrics
Sean Jordan - Lyrics, Vocals
Glen Phillips - Lyrics
Jonathan Coulton - Lyrics, Vocals, Guitar
Raheem Jarbo - Lyrics
DJ Snyder - Scratching
GM7 - Keyboards
Baddd Spellah - Keyboards, Drum Programming, Engineering
Kimmy Gatewood - Vocals
Katrina Dideriksen - Vocals
Rai Kamishiro - Vocals, Translation
Daisuke Kōzuki - Translation
The Categorical Imperative - Drums
Jesse Dangerously - Guest Rapper
Wordburglar - Guest Rapper
The Sturgenius - Drums
Fay Ferency - Cello
John Nolt - Cello
Nate Van iLL - Percussion

External links
 Official Final Boss web page with samples and lyrics

2008 albums
MC Frontalot albums